The greebles are artificial objects designed to be used as stimuli in psychological studies of object and face recognition. They were named by the American psychologist Robert Abelson. The greebles were created for Isabel Gauthier's dissertation work at Yale, so as to share constraints with faces: they have a small number of parts in a common configuration. Greebles have appeared in psychology textbooks, and in more than 25 scientific articles on perception. They are often used in mental rotation task experiments.

Twelve undergraduates of Oberlin College were offered participation in the initial facial rotation experiment, wherein they took part in a rigorous training exercise, with the goal being the creation of experts in recognizing Greebles. For the second test, the "Brightness-Reversal Test," ten of the original participants were joined with twelve undergraduates of Brown University. 30 Greebles were employed in the initial experiment. Each Greeble was assigned a meaningless name, each starting with a unique letter. The Greebles were viewed on Macintosh computer monitors of 72 pixels per inch. Experimentation was divided into one-hour sessions over the course of two weeks, for a total time of 9 hours. Results found the process of Greeble recognition differed from that of facial recognition. Two subjects bearing prosopagnosia proved to be far more capable at the recognition of Greebles than human faces, the latter faculty being a severe disability. Consequently, the study evinced questions regarding the mechanisms of human facial recognition, and whether this facility applies to faces alone, or other object classes.

The study is remarkable because Gauthier demonstrated that, after training participants on the many aspects of greebles, the fusiform face area in the participants' brains responded just as well to greebles as it did to human faces. This suggests that people can improve their ability to recognize faces and objects, and that the fusiform face area is not strictly used for recognizing human faces.

Footnotes

References

External links

 Scott Yu's original Greebles (under the dropdown titled "Novel Objects")

Vision